Castiarina alternecosta is a species of beetle of the genus Castiarina and the family Buprestidae. It was first scientifically described by Thomson in 1879.

Sources 

Beetles described in 1879